Gulmaral Yerkebayeva (born 4 November 1995) is a Kazakhstani freestyle wrestler. She is a four-time bronze medalist at the Asian Wrestling Championships.

Career 

She won the bronze medal in the women's 75 kg event at the 2017 Asian Wrestling Championships held in New Delhi, India. In the same year, she also won the silver medal in the women's 75 kg event at the 2017 Asian Indoor and Martial Arts Games held in Ashgabat, Turkmenistan.

In 2019, she represented Kazakhstan at the Military World Games held in Wuhan, China and she won one of the bronze medals in the 76 kg event.

In 2022, she won one of the bronze medals in the 76 kg event at the Yasar Dogu Tournament held in Istanbul, Turkey. She also won the bronze medal in her event at the 2022 Asian Wrestling Championships held in Ulaanbaatar, Mongolia. She competed in the 76 kg event at the 2022 World Wrestling Championships held in Belgrade, Serbia.

Achievements

References

External links 
 

Living people
1995 births
Place of birth missing (living people)
Kazakhstani female sport wrestlers
Asian Wrestling Championships medalists
21st-century Kazakhstani women